Parchin-e Olya (also Romanized as Parchīn-e ‘Olyā; also known as Parchīn-e Bālā) is a village in Azadlu Rural District, Muran District, Germi County, Ardabil Province, Iran. At the 2006 census, its population was 345, in 54 families.

References 

Towns and villages in Germi County